Stormont—Dundas—South Glengarry is a provincial electoral district in eastern Ontario, Canada. It was created for the 2007 provincial election. 95.5% came from Stormont—Dundas—Charlottenburgh while 4.5% came from Glengarry—Prescott—Russell.

The riding includes all of the united counties of Stormont, Dundas and Glengarry except for the Township of North Glengarry.

Members of Provincial Parliament

Election results

Stormont—Dundas—Charlottenburgh

2007 electoral reform referendum

Sources

Elections Ontario Past Election Results
Map of riding for 2018 election

Cornwall, Ontario
Ontario provincial electoral districts